Bani is the capital of Bani Department in Séno Province in northern Burkina Faso. It had a population of 5 771 in 2008.
Bani is known for its seven mosques made of clay

 and is situated between Kaya, Burkina Faso and Dori, Burkina Faso.

Gallery

References

Populated places in the Centre-Nord Region
Séno Province